Strausbaugh is a surname. Notable people with the surname include:

Jimmy Strausbaugh (1918–1991), American football player
John Strausbaugh (born 1951), American author
Perry Daniel Strausbaugh (1886–1965), American botanist
Scott Strausbaugh (born 1963), American slalom canoer